The Bolska  is a river in Slovenia. It is a right tributary of the Savinja.

References

External links

Rivers of Styria (Slovenia)